Messalonskee High School is a public high school located in Oakland, Maine, United States.  It serves all high school students in the RSU 18 school unit, which includes Oakland, Sidney, Belgrade, China and Rome.  The school was founded in 1969 and currently has slightly more than 700 students enrolled.  The campus features an 826-seat performing arts center that was built for the school in 1993.  In 2005, the district dedicated the Performing Arts Center to former superintendent J. Duke Albanese. Messalonskee is a member of the Kennebec Valley Athletic Conference.

References

External links
 RSU #18 District Website

Public high schools in Maine
Schools in Kennebec County, Maine
Oakland, Maine